In mathematics, an Ockham algebra is a bounded distributive lattice with a dual endomorphism, that is, an operation ~ satisfying ~(x ∧ y) = ~x ∨ ~y, ~(x ∨ y) = ~x ∧ ~y, ~0 = 1, ~1 = 0. Ockham algebras form a variety.

Examples of Ockham algebras include Boolean algebras, De Morgan algebras, Kleene algebras, and Stone algebras.

References

 (pdf  available from GDZ)

Algebraic logic